Robert J. DiRico (born November 22, 1963) is a former American football running back who played one season for the New York Giants. He had 25 rushes for 95 yards in his career. He also had 2 catches for 22 yards. He was a replacement player.

References

1963 births
Living people
American football running backs
New York Giants players
Kutztown Golden Bears football players
Players of American football from Pennsylvania
People from Norristown, Pennsylvania
National Football League replacement players